is a railway station in Iwakuni, Yamaguchi Prefecture, Japan, operated by West Japan Railway Company (JR West).

Lines
Kōjiro Station is served by the Sanyō Main Line.

See also
 List of railway stations in Japan

External links
  

Railway stations in Japan opened in 1944
Railway stations in Yamaguchi Prefecture
Sanyō Main Line